The Angeronini are a small tribe of geometer moths in the subfamily Ennominae. The tribe was first described by William Trowbridge Merrifield Forbes in 1948. As numerous ennomine genera have not yet been assigned to a tribe, the genus list is preliminary.

Genera
Angerona Duponchel, 1829
Lytrosis Hulst, 1896
Euchlaena Hübner, 1823
Xanthotype Warren, 1894
Cymatophora Hübner, 1812

Footnotes

References
  (2008): Family group names in Geometridae. Retrieved July 22, 2008.

 
Taxa named by William Trowbridge Merrifield Forbes
Moth tribes